Kuldeep Raval (born 30 November 1985, full name Kuldeep Chandrakant Raval) is an Indian cricketer who plays for Saurashtra. He was born in Muli, Saurashtra, Gujarat. He was brought by Delhi Daredevils for the 2012 Indian Premier League.

References

1985 births
Delhi Capitals cricketers
Living people
Saurashtra cricketers
Indian cricketers